Abraham DeSomer (December 29, 1884 – August 31, 1974) was an enlisted man and later an officer in the United States Navy. He received America's highest military decoration - the Medal of Honor - for actions during the American intervention at Veracruz, Mexico.

Biography
Abraham DeSomer was born on December 29, 1884, in Milwaukee, Wisconsin. In the early 1900s, he enlisted in the United States Navy from that state. Following his initial sea duty on board the gunboat  in the Philippines, DeSomer transferred to the monitor , which served on the Asiatic Station, and became a Gunner's Mate.

From 1907 to 1911, he was assigned to the battleship . DeSomer was promoted to Chief Petty Officer in 1910. A year later, he reported to the battleship . While serving on that ship from 21–22 April 1914, during the intervention at Veracruz, Mexico, his "extraordinary herosim in the line of his profession" was recognized by the award of the Medal of Honor.

In February 1915 DeSomer was promoted to the Warrant Officer rank of Gunner. During the next four years he served on the transport , the armored cruiser  and the battleship . He was temporarily commissioned as an Ensign in August 1917 and attained the rank of Lieutenant in September 1918. In the Spring of 1919, DeSomer transferred to Naval Training Center, Great Lakes, Illinois. He was made a permanent Lieutenant in August 1920 and, a year later, reported to the newly commissioned battleship .

DeSomer began two more years of training duty at Great Lakes in the summer of 1925, then was assigned to the destroyer tender  and the aircraft carrier  before transferring in November 1930 to Naval Air Station, Pearl Harbor, Hawaii. Following more than thirty years of continuous service as an enlisted man and an officer, Lieutenant DeSomer retired in January 1932.

He returned to active duty in the summer of 1940, after the fall of France prompted a massive expansion of America's defenses. Promoted to Lieutenant Commander on the retired list in February 1942, he remained on active status through the war years.

Abraham DeSomer died on August 31, 1974, and is buried at the San Francisco National Cemetery, San Francisco, California.

Description of Medal of Honor Action
In a letter dated 13 June 1914 to DeSomer, Josephus Daniels quoted Admiral F. F. Fletcher's summary of DeSomer's actions on 21–22 April 1914:
On the afternoon of April 21st, [DeSomer] was placed in charge of a small squad of men and stationed at the corner of a warehouse to eastward of the custom house.  His position was subject to a severe fire from the buildings along Avenida Inadero y Cos, and after several hours of well directed fire he silenced it.  On April 22d when a general advance began, he was sent ahead to locate and silence fire from snipers.  Being an excellent marksman and notably cool, he was especially selected for this work. Later, when two sections of artillery were sent to join Captain Anderson's command, he performed similar services and was almost continually under direct fire from snipers.  His services in this connection were of more value than a whole squad.
—Frank Friday Fletcher
Daniels concluded with:
The Department concurs with the opinion of Rear Admiral Fletcher and highly commends your conspicuous courage, coolness and skill, which were in accord with and added to the best traditions of the naval service. ... In addition a Medal of Honor and a gratuity of One Hundred Dollars has been awarded you.
—Josephus Daniels

Awards
Medal of Honor
Good Conduct Medal
Philippine Campaign Medal
Mexican Service Medal
World War I Victory Medal with "ESCORT" clasp
American Defense Service Medal
American Campaign Medal
World War II Victory Medal

Medal of Honor citation
Rank and organization: Lieutenant, United States Navy, U.S.S. Utah. Place and date: Vera Cruz, Mexico, 21 and April 22, 1914. Entered service at: Wisconsin. Birth: Milwaukee, Wis. 
 
Citation:
On board the U.S.S. Utah, for extraordinary heroism in the line of his profession during the seizure of Vera Cruz, Mexico, 21 and April 22, 1914.

See also

List of Medal of Honor recipients (Veracruz)

References

1884 births
1974 deaths
United States Navy Medal of Honor recipients
United States Navy officers
Military personnel from Milwaukee
Burials at San Francisco National Cemetery
Battle of Veracruz (1914) recipients of the Medal of Honor